Margarita Vaquero Guitarte (born 9 October 1965) is a Spanish former professional tennis and padel player who won a gold medal at the 1983 Mediterranean Games.

On the WTA Tour, she featured twice in the doubles main draw at the Spanish Open (in 1988 and 1989), on both occasions partnering Inmaculada Varas.

References

External links
 
 

1965 births
Living people
Spanish female tennis players
Mediterranean Games gold medalists for Spain
Mediterranean Games medalists in tennis
Competitors at the 1983 Mediterranean Games
Sportspeople from Seville
Tennis players from Andalusia